Softball at the 2006 Central American and Caribbean Games was held at the Chiquinduira softball stadium.

Medal summary

Medal table

References

 

2006 Central American and Caribbean Games
Softball at the Central American and Caribbean Games
Softball in Colombia